Herefossfjorden is a lake in the municipality of Birkenes in Agder county, Norway. The Gauslåfjorden and Uldalsåna lakes flow into Herefossfjorden near the village of Herefoss at the northern end of the lake. The Uldalsåna lake is held back by a dam and the Gauslåfjorden flows over a waterfall (called the Herefossen) into the Herefossfjorden. The Norwegian National Road 41 runs along the eastern shore. The village of Herefoss lies on the northern edge of the lake and the village of Søre Herefoss lies at the southern end of the fjord. The old municipality of Herefoss existed from 1838 until 1967 and it included all the land surrounding the lake.

See also
List of lakes in Aust-Agder
List of lakes in Norway

References

Birkenes
Lakes of Agder
Reservoirs in Norway